Sydow is a surname. Notable people with the surname include:

 Christoph Sydow (1985–2020), German journalist
 Ellinor Südow (born 1998), Swedish professional golfer
 Hans Sydow (1879–1946), German mycologist, son of Paul
 Paul Sydow (1851–1925), German mycologist and lichenologist, father of Hans

See also
 Von Sydow